Danny Richardson (born ) is an English professional rugby league footballer who plays as a  or  for the Castleford Tigers in the Betfred Super League and the England Knights at international level.

He has previously played for St Helens in the Super League, and has spent time on dual registration from the Saints at the Sheffield Eagles and the Leigh Centurions in the Betfred Championship.

Background
Richardson was born in Widnes, Cheshire, England.

Career

St Helens
In 2017, he made his St Helens (Heritage № 1234) début against Leeds.

Sheffield Eagles
Having played just three times in his first season at professional level, Richardson joined Kingstone Press Championship outfit Sheffield Eagles as part of the club's new Dual registration deal with St. Helens. In his first appearance, a 42-34 win against Swinton, the scrum-half scored a try and converted seven goal kicks.

Castleford Tigers
In round 19 of the 2022 Super League season, Richardson scored a try, kicked five goals and one drop goal in Castleford's (Heritage № 995) 35-22 victory over Warrington Wolves.
On 9 August 2022, Richardson signed a two-year contract extension to remain at Castleford until the end of the 2024 season.

International career
In July 2018 he was selected in the England Knights Performance squad.

In 2019 he was selected for the England Knights against Jamaica at Headingley Rugby Stadium.

References

External links
Castleford Tigers profile
SL profile
Saints Heritage Society profile

1996 births
Living people
Castleford Tigers players
England Knights national rugby league team players
English rugby league players
Leigh Leopards players
Rugby league five-eighths
Rugby league halfbacks
Rugby league players from Widnes
Sheffield Eagles players
St Helens R.F.C. players